Violet Club was a nuclear weapon deployed by the United Kingdom during the Cold War. It was Britain's first operational "high-yield" weapon and was intended to provide an emergency capability until a thermonuclear weapon could be developed from the 1956–1958 Operation Grapple tests. Violet Club was ultimately replaced in service by the Red Snow warhead, derived from the US W28.

Conception, design and development
In 1953, shortly after the Americans tested a thermonuclear weapon in 1952, followed by the Soviets with Joe 4, the Atomic Weapons Research Establishment (AWRE) at Aldermaston was asked about the possibilities for a very large pure fission bomb with a yield of one megaton. This study referred to the Zodiak Mk.3 bomb, but progressed no further than a rudimentary study.

At this time studies were also started that ultimately led to a decision in July 1954 to develop a thermonuclear weapon. The design studies were split into two tracks because the British at that time had not yet discovered the Teller–Ulam technique necessary to initiate fusion. One track led to an intermediate design, the so-called "Type A" thermonuclear design, similar to the "Alarm Clock" and layer cake hybrid designs of other nuclear powers. These types of weapons are now regarded as large boosted fission weapons and no longer regarded as thermonuclear. A true thermonuclear design, one that would derive a large amount of its total energy from fusion reactions, was referred to as "Type B".

Development of the Type A design was carried out under Green Bamboo, which weighed about 4,500 lb (2,045 kg), and its spherical shape measured about 45 inches (115 cm) diameter, with a 72-point implosion system. This was intended as the warhead for all projected British strategic delivery systems of the period; the Yellow Sun Stage 1 air-dropped bomb, and the Blue Steel air-launched stand-off missile. The large girth of these weapons was designed to accommodate the diameter of Green Bamboo's implosion sphere.

Green Bamboo was too large to fit in the Blue Streak missile, whose design was already well advanced. This led to a reduced-size design, later known as Orange Herald, which was made smaller largely by reducing the size and complexity of the implosion system. This produced less compression of the core and less efficient use of the fissile fuel, so to make up for this loss of performance the amount of fuel was increased. Estimates computed from reliable sources of actual core cost and cost per kilogram of highly enriched uranium (HEU) put the core sizes of Green Bamboo and Orange Herald as 98 kg and 125 kg respectively, although some other published (and unverified) sources claim lower figures of 87 kg and 117 kg respectively. This design was tested near Australia on Christmas Island, yielding 720 kt.

Ultimately the decision was made to abandon Green Bamboo in favour of the true thermonuclear devices, being developed as the "Granite" series. The first Granite tests were carried out as part of Operation Grapple during May and June 1957. The first, Short Granite, was a failure, generating only 300 kt from an expected yield of around 1 Mt. Plans to test a second identical device, Green Granite, were cancelled as a result. Orange Herald was next, delivering 720 to 800 kt, as expected, making it the largest fission device ever tested. A slightly modified Short Granite was then tested as Purple Granite, but also failed, delivering the same 300 kt.

The abandonment of Green Bamboo and the Granite failures left a capability gap. An emergency capability weapon to fill that gap was devised from elements of both Green Bamboo and Orange Herald; being known as Knobkerry, or Green Grass, and the Interim Megaton Weapon. There were also other factors involved in the decision to build an Interim Megaton Weapon. One was that by 1957 the UK HEU production programme was producing more HEU than required. The Chiefs of Staff were reluctant to see it continue to languish in stores, unused for weapons, when it was being produced at great cost.

The Green Grass warhead containing perhaps 70–86 kg of HEU (although there are no reliable declassified sources for this figure) was therefore hurriedly produced and installed in a modified Blue Danube casing, to be known as Violet Club, until a better solution based on the Yellow Sun casing could be produced, known then with Green Grass installed, as Yellow Sun Mk.1. Only five Violet Club weapons were produced, known by the RAF description of Bomb, Aircraft, HE 9,000 lb HC, and they were stripped of their Green Grass warheads for transfer to the better casings when these became available.

Design features

Violet Club (and to a lesser degree Yellow Sun Mk.1) was not considered a satisfactory design and suffered from numerous design defects. An implosion design, the fissile core of the weapon was a hollow sphere of highly enriched uranium (HEU) which was surrounded by a high-explosive supercharge and 72-lens implosion system. The HEU core was greater than one uncompressed critical mass and to maintain it in a sub-critical condition AWRE fashioned it into a hollow thin-walled sphere. The HEU sphere was collapsed inwards by the supercharge and 72 explosive lenses. However, a fire in the bomb store or a traffic collision on the airfield could easily lead to a partial crushing or collapse of the unremovable uranium shell, and in turn a spontaneous nuclear chain reaction. Subsequently, the number of these steel balls was increased to 133,000, with a reduction in size to approx  diameter. The balls were retained in the device by sealing the hole with a plastic bung.

The steel balls were intended to prevent a nuclear detonation even if the explosives fired accidentally, or in any conceivable accident. The ball bearings had to be removed through the hole in the bomb casing during flight preparation, and after the bomb was winched into the aircraft. The ball bearings then had to be re-inserted into the lowered and upturned bomb before transport back to the bomb store. Without the ball bearings installed, these weapons were armed and live, and too dangerous to be allowed to fly on exercises. Bomber Command exercises demonstrated that flight preparation followed by a scramble take-off could not be reduced below thirty minutes, and on exercises in bad weather and at night a ninety-minute scramble was the norm. At least one accident, dated 1960, was reported in the press when the plastic bung was removed and 133,000 steel ball bearings spilled onto the aircraft hangar floor, leaving the bomb armed and vulnerable. The Royal Air Force were so nervous of the outcome of a fire in storage that permission was sought to store the bombs inverted, so that a loss of the plastic bung could not end with the steel balls on the floor, leaving the HEU unprotected against a subsequent explosion. Even without the partial nuclear detonation feared by the RAF, there was "a risk of catastrophe".

AWRE's trickery with the steel balls had other unintended outcomes. Even an event as inconsequential as early morning frost was an issue. Violet Club could be loaded into a bomber for up to thirty days on standby while parked overnight on a remote base where the bomb could get very cold. If the steel balls froze together inside the bomb cavity and could not be removed, the bomb was useless. AWRE's solution was to fit the bomb with an electric blanket. Because the bombs were armed before flight, the take-off was hazardous; the bombs could not be jettisoned, and landing with an armed bomb on return to base was too hazardous to contemplate. As a consequence, Violet Club could not be used on an airborne alert, or even flown to a remote dispersal base.

Other design flaws centred on a requirement for a strip-down and inspection at six-monthly intervals, this took three weeks per weapon using AWRE civilian staff. The unstable nature of the bomb required that the work be done in-situ at RAF facilities, causing considerable disruption to operational duties. There were three main reasons for the strip-down and these were deterioration of the rubber bag, corrosion of the steel balls, and deterioration of the HE, which was prone to cracking. Replacement of a weapon's HE would cost the RAF in excess of £90,000 adjusted to 2006 prices.

Green Grass/Violet Club was the first UK-deployed weapon to dispense with the crude polonium and beryllium impact or crush type initiators used in Fat Man and other early US weapons together with the British Blue Danube and Red Beard. Instead it used an electronic neutron initiator (ENI) known as Blue Stone. This had the great advantage of being adjustable, allowing the neutron burst to be triggered at precisely the right moment. Most of these mechanisms originated from Blue Danube although the radar altimeter fuze was omitted. The electrical power for these fuzing mechanisms and the firing mechanisms of the 72-lens,  implosion device came from lead-acid accumulators located in the tail of the Blue Danube casing. These were commercially sourced six-volt motorcycle batteries.

Controversy
Green Grass struggled to meet the Chiefs of Staff requirement for an Interim Megaton [yield] Weapon. It was never tested, and initially, AWRE estimated its yield at 500 kt based on the Orange Herald test of 720kt, and non-nuclear tests of the HE implosion sphere fitted with non-fissile cores. A Mr Challens of AWRE who later became the Director of AWRE then claimed to the Air Staff that

A play-on-words that later returned to haunt AWRE when later estimates revised the yield to 400kt. Challens also stated on behalf of AWRE that

The Royal Air Force was not amused, with Bomber Command Staff officers minuting their seniors with remarks like this one.

Senior levels of the RAF believed they had been sold a lemon. Further, the weapon was of uncertain safety in the hands of the inexperienced RAF.

The fifth and last Violet Club weapon was due for delivery to the RAF by the end of May 1959 and all were withdrawn by 1960, but in their Yellow Sun Mk.1 form they survived until 1963, when all had been replaced with Yellow Sun Mk.2 with Red Snow warheads installed. They were only used by the Avro Vulcan bomber.

Conclusion
These very large and dirty fission bombs were the largest pure-fission bombs deployed by any state, and unlike their predecessors, Blue Danube and Red Beard, they used HEU as a fissile material rather than plutonium, the reason being primarily economic. The cost of HEU to the Royal Air Force was (at 1958-9 prices) £19,200 per kg, with plutonium priced at £143,000 per kg. Although a HEU weapon needed more fissile material for a given yield than a plutonium weapon, a saving per weapon was of the order of £22.7M at 2006 prices. Thirty-seven Green Grass warheads were built (twelve as Violet Club) saving the Treasury £840M. The influence of the Treasury on weapons procurement should not be underestimated: it reaches even into weapons design. Clearly, there were economic benefits in building large and dirty U-235 fission bombs, rather than cleaner, but more expensive plutonium weapons, especially given the shortage of plutonium. By 1958 Britain's accumulated production of plutonium was only 472.2 kg and a proportion of that was bartered to the United States in exchange for HEU and other items. Up to 1958, British output of HEU was only 860 kg, while the United States supplied the UK with approximately seven tons of HEU from their less costly production process. So HEU used for Green Grass was purchased cheaply from the U.S. while selling to the U.S. the unwanted and high-priced weapons-grade plutonium.

Knobkerry, alias Green Grass, alias Interim Megaton Weapon, alias Violet Club and Yellow Sun Mk.1, had one other distinction. It was the last entirely British nuclear weapon deployed with the UK Armed Services. The British Operation Grapple thermonuclear weapon tests at Christmas Island in 1957-58 were the end of this evolution. There were no more wholly home-grown designs. Britain never deployed a true thermonuclear weapon of wholly home-grown design. All the weapons tested at Operation Grapple were abandoned, because AWRE no longer needed them, although some of their features were undoubtedly incorporated into later weapons. These Granite-type devices were all experimental devices, needing to be developed further into reliable Service-engineered warheads at considerable cost in time and money. The U.S. designs offered after 1958 were fully tested and engineered, and cheap to produce. They were manufactured in Britain from British materials and U.S. blueprints. They were British property and there were no American political constraints on their use, they were a favourable deal for the Treasury, and Violet Club and Yellow Sun Mk.1 bridged the gap until the American designs could be manufactured.

See also
Ivy King, the largest pure-fission nuclear bomb ever tested by the United States.

Footnotes

References
 Leitch, Andy. "V-Force Arsenal: Weapons for the Valiant, Victor and Vulcan". Air Enthusiast No. 107, September/October 2003. pp. 52–59. 
 Norris, Burrows and Fieldhouse, Nuclear Weapons Databook Vol.5, British, French and Chinese Nuclear Weapons. Published Westview Press, Oxford, 1994. 
 Prof J.E.Harris, MBE, FREng, FRS, FIM. Interdisciplinary Science Reviews. The threat of nuclear terrorism. Published ISR 1999 Vol.4, No.2. .
 Prof J.E.Harris, MBE, FREng, FRS, FIM. Interdisciplinary Science Reviews. Plutonium: from star dust to Star Wars. Published ISR 2001, Vol.26, No.1. .

External links
 
 history 
 Richard Moore's nuclear_history guide originally published by the Mountbatten Centre for International Studies, University of Southampton.
 Violet Club by a writer who worked on it at manufacture.
 British rock band inspired by the weapon
 The song Interim Megaton Nuclear Weapon, celebrating the idiosyncratic design of Violet Club.

Cold War weapons of the United Kingdom
Nuclear bombs of the United Kingdom
Military equipment introduced in the 1950s